Winifred Mary Adelaide Brooke (16 February 1893 – 4 November 1975) was a British botanist, illustrator and author who made scientifically significant collections of botany specimens, including in the Bolivian Andes. The plant genus Misbrookea was named in her honour by Vicki Funk.

Early life

Brooke was born on 16 February 1893 in Stroud Green, London, England. She was the daughter of Margaret Ling Brooke (née Livermore) and Rev. Charles William Alfred Brooke. During her childhood she spend time in Switzerland and co-authored a travel book with her mother on the subject.

Brooke was the President of the Alton Natural History Society, was elected as a member of the British Entomological and Natural History Society in 1930, and was elected to the Linnean Society of London on 24 May 1946.

Plant collecting 

In 1936, Brooke traveled to the Canary Islands where she collected botanical specimens now held in the Natural History Museum, London, the New York Botanical Garden and the Field Museum. She also traveled to Lesotho collecting and making water colour sketches of plants from 1937 to 1938. While there, she made scientifically important botany collections that are held at the Natural History Museum, London. In 1948 Brooke undertook a journey to South America on the encouragement of Dr. John Ramsbottom, of the British Museum Natural History. She traveled first to Bolivia, arriving in December 1948, staying there until November 1949. Brooke herself acknowledged the assistance of Professor Martín Cárdenas during this time. She then traveled on to Chile. While in South America she established a collection of over 2000 herbarium specimens and described numerous species new to science. Brooke also traveled to Sarawak, again collecting specimens and describing species new to science. Some of the specimens she collected in Sarawak were subsequently sold to the Smithsonian Institution.

Death
She died in Alton, Hampshire on 4 November 1975. The Royal Geographical Society holds Brooke's notes on Switzerland and her guidebooks.

Eponyms 
The genus and some of the species named in honour of Brooke are:
 Misbrookea
 Stephanophysum brookeae, now regarded as a synonym of Ruellia longipedunculata.
 Cleistocactus brookeae
 Cosmianthemum brookeae
 Filetia brookeae
 Phyllagathis brookei

Publications 

As Author:
 Winter life in Switzerland : its sports and health resorts by Margaret L Brooke, Winifred M A Brooke and Adolf Eichenberger. London : Isaac Pitman & Sons, 1913.
 Some Observations on the Life History of Arthrocnodak wissmani Kieffer (Cecidomyidae: Diptera). Entomologist 64 (1931): 1–3.
 Sketches from Nature in the North of Ireland. R. Carswell & Son: Belfast, 1935.
 Some Bolivian plants Proceedings and transactions of the South London Entomological & Natural History Society. 1950–1953: 137–143
 Contributions on Trepanning or Trephination in Ancient and Modern Times by Kenneth Page Oakley, W. M. A. Brooke, A. R. Akester, and D. R. Brothwell. Royal Anthropological Institute of Great Britain and Ireland, 1959.

As Illustrator:
 Lace in the making : with bobbins and needle by Margaret L. Brooke.
 Insect life, its why and wherefore. by Hubert George Stanley.

References

1893 births
1975 deaths
British botanists
British women artists
Botanical illustrators
20th-century British women scientists